was a town located in Shida District, Shizuoka, Japan.

Okabe developed in the Edo period as Okabe-juku, a post-town on the Tōkaidō.

As of 2003, the town had an estimated population of 12,839 and a density of 240.93 persons per km². The total area was 53.29 km². The town was served by an interchange on Japan National Route 1, but had no train service.

On January 1, 2009, Okabe was merged into the expanded city of Fujieda and thus no longer exists as an independent municipality. Shida District was dissolved as a result of the merger.

References

Populated places disestablished in 2009
Dissolved municipalities of Shizuoka Prefecture
Fujieda, Shizuoka